Ron Thomas may refer to:
 Ron Thomas (basketball)
 Ron Thomas (footballer)
 Ron Thomas (bowls)
 Ron Thomas (tennis)

See also
 Ronald Thomas (disambiguation)